Lemalle is a village in Palnadu district, Andhra Pradesh, India on the way to Amaravati from Guntur. 14th Mile is also part of Lemalle grama panchayat and commercial area of this village.

Geography 

Lemalle is 10.5 km far from its Mandal main town Amaravathi and 21.8 km distance from its District main city Guntur.

Nearby Villages include Karlapudi(1.5 km), Endroy (2.5 km), Mothadaka (3.2 km), Unguturu (3.3 km), and Nekkallu (3.9 km). Nearby towns include Thullur(9.6 km), Amaravathi(10.5 km), Tadikonda(10.6 km), and Pedakurapadu(15.1 km).

Communication 

Lemalle Pin Code is 522016 and Post office name is Lemalle. BSNL Telephone Exchange and CellOne mobile phone towers are there in this village.

Education 

The Government Elementary School offers primary education. Sri Rama High School ( Located in between 14th mile and Motadaka village) offers high school education. In addition to these Govt. schools, Venus Public school located at 14th mile offers primary and secondary education.

Places of worship 

Sivalayam is the biggest Hindu temple in this village. Raamalayam, Aanjaneyaswami Gudi, Sri Nidanampaati Lakshmi Tirupatamma Ammavaari temples are other Hindu temples. Along with Hindu temples we can find a mosque and a church in this village.

Transport 

Lemalle lies on Amaravathi Road. APS RTC runs bus services from NTR bus station, Guntur and Amaravathi to here.

References

Villages in Palnadu district